Spider-Man: Blue is a comic book limited series written by Jeph Loeb and illustrated by Tim Sale. It ran for a total of six issues and has been reprinted in trade paperback form. Loeb and Sale had also worked on the limited series: Daredevil: Yellow, Hulk: Gray and Captain America: White which also chronicle their respective Marvel Comics characters in their formative years.

Plot
It is Valentine's Day, and Spider-Man describes himself as feeling "blue". Although Gwen Stacy, Parker's first love, died a while ago, he still feels blue for her to this day. So, Spider-Man recounts into a tape recorder how Gwen and he fell in love.

The series then recounts the events from The Amazing Spider-Man (vol. 1) #40–48 and #63, though it switches time order and implies that Kraven the Hunter, who appeared in #47, is behind all of the villains who attack Spider-Man. It retells Peter standing between Gwen and Mary Jane Watson, berated by his friend Harry Osborn.

In the end, it is Valentine's Day, and Gwen asks Peter to be her valentine. Peter states how her death has scarred him. Her one-time rival Mary Jane taught Peter to love again, but he reveals how much he misses Gwen. Suddenly, he notices his wife Mary Jane listening. Instead of being angry, Mary Jane feels deep sympathy for her husband and tells Peter to say hello to Gwen for her and to tell her how much she misses her, too. On this note, the story ends.

Collected editions

Notes

References

External links 
 

2002 comics debuts
2003 comics endings